Pereswetoff-Morath  (or just ) is a Swedish noble family of Russian origin, one of the so-called bayor families. Varyingly traced to the Blessed Alexander Peresvet of Radonezh (died 1380) and to a certain Vasiliy Ivanovich Peresvet in early-15th-century Dmitrov (NW of Moscow), the family, in the person of Murat Alekseyevich Peresvetov (died  1640) from Rostov Velikij, entered Swedish service in 1613-14 during the Ingrian War. Throughout the 17th century, family members were mainly active in the Swedish province of Ingria, near the Russian border. Immatriculated in 1652 at the Swedish House of Nobility (Riddarhuset), it remained for three centuries a family of officers and lawyers. In 1919, on the death of Carl Fredrik Pereswetoff-Morath, the unbroken male line was discontinued. However, Carl Fredrik had an adopted son, Carl-Magnus (1896–1975), the biological son of Magnus Dahlqvist (d. 1895) and Ida Pereswetoff-Morath in their marriage, and thus second (and third) cousin once removed of his adoptive father. All living family members are descendants of lieutenant-colonel Carl-Magnus Pereswetoff-Morath; the surviving line is not represented at the House of Nobility. Among notable members are Colonel Alexander Pereswetoff-Morath (originally Alexander Moraht Pereswetoff, d. 1687), commandant of Nyenskans (Ingria), and his son, General Carl Pereswetoff-Morath, 1665–1736, active with his two brothers on the Baltic front in the Great Northern War (prisoner of war in Moscow 1704–21). Among the descendants of lieutenant-colonel Carl-Magnus Pereswetoff-Morath are the former general secretary of the Swedish Civil Defence Association, Magnus Pereswetoff-Morath (b. 1921), and the Slavist, Professor Alexander Pereswetoff-Morath (b. 1969).

The 16th-century Muscovite publicist Ivan Semyonovich Peresvetov has been believed to have belonged to another, west Russian, family. However, the historian Andrei Kuzmin recently made a case for regarding these as branches of one family.

See also
 List of Swedish noble families
 Russian bayors

References

 Gustaf Elgenstierna, Den introducerade Svenska adelns ättartavlor, Vol. 5, Stockholm 1930.
 Lind, J. H., ‘De ingermanlandske «Ryss-Bajorer»: Deres sociale og genealogiske baggrund’, in: Gentes Finlandiae, vol. 6, 1984.
 Svenska släktkalendern 2000, Stockholm 2000.
 Зимин, А.А., И.С. Пересветов и его современники: очерки по истории русской общественно–политической мысли середины XVI века, М. 1958.
 Кузьмин, А.В., ‘Андрей Ослебя, Александр Пересвет и их потомки в конце XIV - первой половине XVI в.’, in: Н.И. Троицкий и современные исследования историко-культурного наследия Центральной России: сборник научных статей, T. II, Тула 2002.
 Пересветов-Мурат, А.И., ‘Из Ростова в Ингерманандию: М.А. Пересветов и другие русские baijor''' ы’, in: Новгородский исторический сборник'', вып. 7 (17), 1999, http://norroen.info/articles/peresvetov/bajors.html.
 https://www.swedesintexas.com/descend.php?personID=I838780&tree=sit0001&display=compact&generations=9

Ingria
Swedish noble families
Swedish people of Russian descent